Giorgio de Bettin (born 7 August 1972 in Pieve di Cadore, Italy) is an Italian former professional ice hockey player. He is currently the head coach for SG Cortina of the Alps Hockey League (AlpsHL).

de Bettin played in Italian Hockey League - Serie A for USG Zoldo, Asiago, HC Courmaosta, SG Cortina and HC Milano.

He was also a member of the Italy national team. He participated at the 2002, 2006, 2007, 2008 and 2010 IIHF World Championship, as well as the 2006 Winter Olympics.

References

External links
 

1972 births
Living people
Asiago Hockey 1935 players
Courmaosta HC players
HC Milano players
Ice hockey players at the 2006 Winter Olympics
Italian ice hockey right wingers
Italy men's national ice hockey team coaches
Olympic ice hockey players of Italy
Sportspeople from the Province of Belluno
SG Cortina players